Michael Leigh may refer to:

 Mike Leigh, British writer; film/stage director
 Dr Michael Leigh, Director General, Enlargement, European Commission, Brussels, see 2012 New Year Honours
 Michael Leigh (artist), British mail artist
Mike Leigh (sailor), Canadian sailor
Mickey Leigh, member of Harry Slash & The Slashtones

See also
Michael Lee (disambiguation)